The Temecula Valley AVA is an American Viticultural Area in the Temecula Valley, located in southwestern Riverside County, California.

History 
Winemaking in the Temecula area was revived in the late 1960s with plantings made by the Brookside Winery.

Vincenzo and Audry Cilurzo established the first modern commercial vineyard in the Temecula Valley in 1968. At the same time, Guasti-based Brookside Winery planted its own vineyard. Mount Palomar Winery was established in 1969, by John Poole, former owner of the radio station K-BIG and who also established one of the nation's first UHF television stations (Channel 22 in Los Angeles), and created Los Angeles' first commercially successful FM radio station. John introduced a number of "firsts" in the Temecula Valley, most significantly beginning the trend to Mediterranean grape varieties, planting the first Sangiovese grapes in the area, established the first wine cave in the area and also the oldest outdoor Sherry Solera in the United States. In 1971, Brookside produced the first wines from Temecula grapes at their Guasti winery. The Callaway Vineyard and Winery began farming grapes in 1969 and opened the first public tasting room in 1974. (Owner Ely Callaway Jr. also started Callaway Golf.) John Poole's Mount Palomar Winery opened its doors to the public in 1975, and in 1978 the Cilurzos opened the third Temecula winery. Their original vineyard is now owned by Maurice Carrie Winery.

The Alcohol and Tobacco Tax and Trade Bureau established the "Temecula AVA" in the Federal Register on October 23, 1984. The TTB renamed the same viticultural area "Temecula Valley AVA" effective June 18, 2004, approving an application made by the Temecula Valley Winegrowers Association. This is the only American Viticultural Area to change its name following initial approval. Within the appellation there are  located in a "protected" area referred to as the Citrus/Vineyard Zone. This area is generally located in and around the Rancho California Road area within the County of Riverside. County guidelines strictly enforce the number of acres needed to build a winery, lodging and other limited housing and commercial ventures.

Climate 
A look at the native chaparral shows that Temecula is in a relatively low rainfall region. These two factors contribute to an early growing season that generally runs from March through September. Rains, however, rarely interrupt the harvest season, an important factor in wine quality. Extensive research has shown that the Temecula Valley is ideal for growing high-quality wine grapes as mist often lingers until mid-morning on the  plateau, located below the peaks of the local mountain ranges.

Significant cooling factors affect the flavor development of the grapes. As the sun warms the inland valleys east of Temecula, the air rises, forming a low-pressure area. The colder, much heavier air from the Pacific Ocean, just  from Temecula, is then drawn inland. The coastal mountain range allows the colder air to pass inland through gaps and low spots. The Rainbow Gap and the Temecula Gorge are two of these low places in the mountains, and just beyond them lay the Temecula Valley. The cool air flowing inland moderates the daytime temperatures and helps to create a pattern of warm sunny days and cool nights, ideal conditions for the best wine grapes.

Another meteorological factor affecting the valley's climate is the "lapse rate." It involves the altitude of the vineyard land and the height of the surrounding mountains. The surrounding mountains average  to nearly  elevation. The heavy cold air that collects between the high peaks during the night drains off the heights much like water, joining cold moist air from the Santa Margarita River, creating a double cooling effect. As a result, nighttime lows in and around Temecula are very cool. The cool nighttime temperatures are critical in developing high-quality grapes.

Temecula Valley soils are another significant influence on wine quality. The soils are created from decomposing granitic materials and are excellent for growing high-quality grapes. Grapevines require well-drained soils with roots that are not constantly wet. The granitic soils permit the water to drain through quite easily. Granitic soils, which are a light sandy loam, contribute to clean, pure varietal flavors without odd or herbaceous flavors that wetter soil may create.

Grape Varieties 
Since 1966, wine grapes have been grown in the area. In addition to growing Chardonnay, Merlot, and Sauvignon Blanc, recently, wineries have begun growing Viognier, Syrah, and Pinot Gris. The Temecula Valley's warmer climate is particularly well-suited to Rhône varieties, as well as Cabernet Sauvignon, and Zinfandel. The region is less well-suited to growing cooler-climate varieties like Pinot noir.

Tourism 
The popularity of the Temecula Valley Wine Country and Pechanga Resort & Casino have been the driving forces in a fourfold increase in visitor spending in the valley from $131 million in 2000 to an estimated $538 million in 2006, according to a report released by the Temecula Valley Convention & Visitors Bureau. According to Visit Temecula Valley's 2018 economic impact report, in 2018 there was a 26% increase in tourism spending, reaching $1.1 billion spent, up from nearly $900 million spent in 2017.

The Temecula Valley is a huge tourist destination on weekends. There are over 40 wineries that offer public wine tasting. Many of the wineries are on vast areas and many offer modern tasting rooms designed to service scores of people at once. Many are also wedding destination sites, host live music performances in the summer, and offer lodging services such as bed and breakfast and resort accommodations, as well as vineyard tours, sunset barbecues, and hot air balloon rides. Major annual events include the Temecula Valley Balloon & Wine Festival and the Harvest Wine Celebration.

Temecula Agricultural Conservancy 
Concurrently, the Temecula Agricultural Conservancy (TAC), a 501(c)(3) non-profit public benefit corporation, was formed with the primary mission of preserving vineyards, and open space suitable for vineyards. TAC will work with the county supervisors to implement the new zoning ordinance by holding open space, vineyards and/or conservation easements, ensuring that the land remains in vineyards in perpetuity.
 
TAC also works with vineyard owners who wish to voluntarily protect their vineyards with conservation easements in an effort to ensure that the vineyards remain. Conservation easements are used to preserve farmland and open space throughout the United States. An agricultural conservation easement recorded on vineyard land limits the future use of that land to vineyards in perpetuity, but the vineyard owner continues to own and farm the land. By donating a conservation easement to TAC, a vineyard owner can receive a charitable tax deduction. Grants provided by the California Farmland Conservancy Program are available to organizations like TAC. These grants can be used to purchase conservation easements from vineyard owners.

Temecula Valley Winegrowers Association 
The Temecula Valley Winegrowers Association is a nonprofit regional organization (501(C)(6)) dedicated to promoting the making and growing of quality wine and wine grapes in the Temecula Appellation.

References

External links 
 

American Viticultural Areas
American Viticultural Areas of Southern California
Agriculture in Riverside County, California
Geography of Riverside County, California
Santa Ana Mountains
Valleys of Riverside County, California
1984 establishments in California